Mariana Correa (born 4 November 1984) is an Ecuadorian former professional tennis player.

Biography
Although born in Miami, Correa mostly grew up in Ecuador's capital Quito, where she moved as a child in 1992. She is a dual citizen of both Ecuador and the United States. As a junior she attained a highest ranking of 26 in the world.

Correa, a right-handed player, made her WTA Tour main draw debut at the 2002 Copa Colsanitas in Bogotá, winning her way through qualifying, before being beaten in the first round by María Sánchez Lorenzo.

Originally retiring from the tour in 2006, she has since made multiple comebacks.

In 2010, she featured in five Fed Cup ties for Ecuador and won all three of her singles matches, as well as three of her four doubles rubbers.

ITF finals

Singles (0–1)

Doubles (3–3)

References

External links
 
 
 

1984 births
Living people
Ecuadorian female tennis players
American emigrants to Ecuador
Tennis players from Miami
Sportspeople from Quito
21st-century Ecuadorian women